Benjamin Ian Kowalewicz (born December 16, 1975) is a Canadian singer and songwriter. He is the lead vocalist of rock band Billy Talent.

Early life
Kowalewicz, of Polish descent, was born December 16, 1975, in Pierrefonds, Quebec, and raised in Streetsville, Ontario.  He attended Our Lady of Mount Carmel Secondary School, where he was a drummer in a band named To Each His Own.

Career 
In To Each His Own, Kowalewicz met Jonathan Gallant. Kowalewicz moved from drummer to vocals and rhythm guitar, and Aaron Solowoniuk was recruited to play drums. The three would then meet Ian D'Sa to form a band called Pezz. Pezz released their first album, Watoosh!, in 1998. After being threatened with a lawsuit by an American band who was also using the name Pezz, Kowalewicz suggested the name Billy Talent, taken from a character from Michael Turner's Hard Core Logo. Kowalewicz focused his work on vocals only, and Billy Talent was born. In this time, Kowalewicz worked in a number of positions at Toronto radio station 102.1 the Edge, as an assistant for The Ongoing History of New Music host Alan Cross, to contribute funds towards Billy Talent's first album.

Kowalewicz is featured in the song "Smiling Politely" by Cancer Bats from their album Hail Destroyer. He was featured in the song "Wake Up the Town" by Anti-Flag, which was a bonus track on their 2008 album The Bright Lights of America.

His home in the Parkdale neighbourhood of Toronto was featured on the Canadian home decorating show Designer Guys. The episode is entitled "Punk Meets Traditional".
Kowalewicz can also play guitar and drums. He wrote drums for "The Ex" which appears on Billy Talent's self-titled album.

Kowalewicz provided guest vocals for Rammstein guitarist Richard Kruspe's side project Emigrate. He provided co-lead vocals for the song "1234" on Emigrate's album A Million Degrees, as well as performing in the song's music video with a cameo appearance from Billy Talent bandmate Ian D'Sa.

Discography

Billy Talent

 Billy Talent (2003)
 Billy Talent II (2006)
 Billy Talent III (2009)
 Dead Silence (2012)
 Afraid of Heights (2016)
 Crisis of Faith (2022)

Guest appearances
 Anti-Flag – "Wake Up the Town" on The Bright Lights of America (2008)
 Cancer Bats – "Smiling Politely" on Hail Destroyer (2008)
 K-OS - "Say It Ain't So (originally by Weezer)" on Much Music Presents: k-os Live (2011)
 Emigrate – "1234" on A Million Degrees (2018)

References

External links
 

1975 births
Living people
Anglophone Quebec people
Canadian people of Polish descent
Musicians from Montreal
Canadian male singers
Canadian rock singers
Canadian punk rock singers
Canadian rock drummers
Canadian male drummers
Billy Talent members
21st-century Canadian drummers